Frank Vincent may refer to:

Frank Vincent (1937–2017), American actor and entrepreneur
Frank Vincent (judge) (born 1937), Australian jurist
Frank Vincent (American football) (1932–2010), American football player and coach
Frank Vincent (footballer) (born 1999), English footballer
Captain Frank Vincent, the commander of the Pendleton volunteers attacked by Egan (Paiute)

See also
Francis Vincent (disambiguation)